Puff may refer to:

Science and technology
 Puff, a small quantity of gas or smoke in the air
 Puff, a light gust of wind
 Exhalation
 Inhalation
 Puff model, volcanic ash tracking model developed at the University of Alaska Fairbanks
 PUFFS (NetBSD), a NetBSD kernel subsystem developed for running filesystems in userspace
 Chromosome puff or "Puffs", diffused uncoiled regions of the polytene chromosome that are sites of RNA transcription

 Picofarad (pF), a unit of capacitance sometimes pronounced "puff"

Foods
 Cocoa Puffs, a brand of chocolate-flavored puffed grain breakfast cereal, manufactured by General Mills
 Cream puff or profiterole
 Curry puff
 Puff pastry
 Puffed grain
 Cheese puffs, extruded corn snacks (and other flavors)
 Sugar Puffs, a brand of sugar-frosted puffed grain breakfast cereal

Military
 Passive Underwater Fire Control Feasibility System, a US Navy submarine sonar system
 Douglas AC-47 Spooky (nickname "Puff, the Magic Dragon"), a US Air Force ground-attack aircraft

People with the name
 Puffy AmiYumi, Japanese rock duo
 Puff Daddy or Sean Combs (born 1969), rapper
 Puff Johnson (1972–2013), American singer
 Puff Kuo (born 1988), Taiwanese singer and actress

Fictional characters
 Puff, a character in Peter, Paul and Mary's 1963 song "Puff, the Magic Dragon"
 Mr. Puff, a character in Sheridan's 1779 play The Critic
 Mrs. Puff, a character in the television series SpongeBob SquarePants

Other uses
 Puff piece or puffery, exaggerated advertising claims
 Puff sleeve
 Powder puff, face-powder applicator
 Puffs (facial tissue), an American brand of facial tissue from Procter & Gamble
Puffs, or Seven Increasingly Eventful Years at a Certain School of Magic and Magic, a 2015 play which is a pastiche of the Harry Potter book series

See also

 Pouf or pouffe
 Poof (disambiguation)
 Puff adder (disambiguation)
 Puffer (disambiguation)
 Puffy (disambiguation)
 Puff the Magic Dragon (disambiguation)
 The Powerpuff Girls, an American superhero animated television series